General Forrest may refer to:

John F. Forrest (1927–1997), U.S. Army lieutenant general
Nathan Bedford Forrest (1821–1877), Confederate States Army lieutenant general
Nathan Bedford Forrest III (1905−1943), U.S. Army brigadier general
William Charles Forrest (1819–1902), British Army general

See also
Jean-Marie Forest (1752–1799), French Revolutionary brigadier general